Mario Martínez was the defending champion, but chose to compete at Geneva in the same week.

Andrés Gómez won the title by defeating Thierry Tulasne 7–6, 7–6, 6–1 in the final.

Seeds

Draw

Finals

Top half

Bottom half

References

External links
 Official results archive (ATP)
 Official results archive (ITF)

1981 Grand Prix (tennis)
ATP Bordeaux